The Claflin family are a Scottish American family of 17th century New England origins. The descendants of Robert Maclachlan of Wenham, Massachusetts, a Scottish soldier and prisoner of war from the Battle of Dunbar (1650) assumed to have belonged to the Clan Maclachlan, and his wife Joanna Warner, members of the family have distinguished themselves in various occupations and regions of the United States.

Revolutionary War
Although not of great means in the early generations, a considerable number of the Claflin family, twenty four in all, fought as militiamen and soldiers on the American side in the American Revolutionary War, including at Lexington and Concord (many), the Battle of Bunker Hill (several),  the Battle of White Plains (one), and finally in the Saratoga campaign (two, possibly more), with Nathaniel Claflin being present at the Surrender of Burgoyne. Their length of service varied from only eight days to several months and years, with a few serving as junior officers. In addition, three more members served as drummers, and two more as pipers.

Earlier in the French and Indian War several Claflins joined in the Crown Point Expedition.

People
 Adelaide Avery Claflin, suffragist, born Adelaide Avery
 Avery Claflin, composer and banker
 Bruce Claflin, businessman
 Edith Claflin, linguist and scholar
 Horace Brigham Claflin, businessman, H.B. Claflin & Company
 Increase Claflin, pioneer, first white settler of Door County, Wisconsin
 Ira W. Claflin, Civil War officer
 Lee Claflin, philanthropist 
 Tennessee Celeste Claflin, suffragist, broker, and rumoured mistress of Cornelius Vanderbilt. Later became Lady Cook, Viscountess of Montserrat.
 Victoria Woodhull née Claflin, suffragist, broker, and presidential candidate. Subject of Onward Victoria.
 William Claflin, Governor of Massachusetts and philanthropist
 William Henry Claflin Jr., businessman and amateur archaeologist

Female line:
 Harvey Claflin Mansfield, Jr., Professor of Government at Harvard University. Grandmother was Adelaide Claflin daughter of Harvey Thatcher Claflin.

Places and institutions
 Adams Claflin House
 Boston University, co-founded by Lee Claflin, charter signed by son William Claflin
 Claflin, Kansas
 Claflin-Richards House, home of Robert Mackclothlan
 Claflin School
 Claflin University, land donated by William and Lee Claflin
 Woodhull & Claflin's Weekly

See also
 Robert Claflin Rusack, Episcopal Bishop of Los Angeles
 Claflin-Norrish House
 Claflin doctrine

Notes

References

 Gerrard et al, Lost Lives, New Voices: Unlocking the Stories of the Scottish Soldiers at the Battle of Dunbar 1650. Oxford: Oxbow Books. 2018.
 Wight, Charles Henry, Genealogy of the Claflin Family, 1661–1898. New York: Press of William Green. 1903. Full scan at the Internet Archive.

External
 Claflin Family Association

 
Families from Massachusetts
American families of Scottish ancestry